The Bari-Casamassima-Putignano railway is a  long Italian railway line, that connects Bari with Putignano via Casamassima.

The line was opened on 6 September 1905.

Usage
The line is used by the following service(s):

Local services (Treno regionale) Bari - Casamassima - Putignano

Electrification
The railway is being electrified, largely with funds from the European Union, with most works completed in 2014. The FSE has requested a tender for four trains.

See also 
 List of railway lines in Italy

References

This article is based upon a translation of the Italian language version as at October 2014.

External links 

Railway lines in Apulia
Railway lines opened in 1905
1905 establishments in Italy